Cheng Wen-tang (born 1958) is a Taiwanese director and producer. He got his start creating documentaries on social movements in 1980s Taiwan. He began creating narrative films in the 1990s and has gone on to collaborate with his daughter, singer Enno Cheng, on several projects.

He has served president of the Kaohsiung Film Festival and is a part-time assistant-professor level teacher at National Chengchi University.

Early life 
Cheng was born in Yilan County, Taiwan in 1958 and grew up in Luodong. He graduated from Chinese drama school of the Chinese Culture University.

Career 
Cheng got his start in filmmaking making documentaries, with a focus on social movements in 1980s Taiwan. He made his first television film debut with Lanyang River Youth (1998).

Cheng's first collaboration with his daughter, Enno Cheng, was on Badu's Homework. The short film was her writing debut at 16 and won Best Short at the 2003 Golden Horse Awards.

Cheng began serving as president of the Kaohsiung Film Festival in 2004.

The National Palace Museum commissioned Cheng to produce a short film with a  budget. Given the size of the budget, he convinced the museum to turn the project into a feature length film that could be released commercially; Cheng brought in another  for the budget. The Passage later earned  at the box office and was entered into the Tokyo Film Festival.

His second feature Somewhere Over the Dreamland (2002) is about two Aboriginal Taiwanese men's adventure in urban Taipei. It was screened at the 59th Venice International Film Festival as part of the International Critics' Week section.

Cheng has taught at National Chengchi University's College of Communications as an assistant-professor level contracted teacher since 2012.

Cheng and Chang Yih-feng collaborated on the music video for "Supreme Pain for the Tyrant", Chthonic's song from their 2013 album Bu-Tik.

Style and themes 
Cheng has expressed an admiration for realism, specifically the works of authors Huang Chun-ming and Chen Yingzhen and director Ken Loach.

Personal life 
Cheng is the father of singer-songwriter Enno Cheng.

Filmography

Awards and nominations

References 

Taiwanese film directors
Chinese Culture University alumni
People from Luodong, Yilan County, Taiwan
1958 births
Living people